Urban Wetlands Law is a Chilean law regulating wetlands in urban areas. The law intends to provide a set of "minimal criteria for the sustainability of urban wetlands, safeguarding its ecological characteristics and their functioning, and to maintain the hydrological regime, both on surface and under the ground". 

At the request of municipal government the law allows for the Ministry of the Environment to  declare official urban wetlands. The Ministry of the Environment can also declare official urban wetlands by its own initiative.  

The law modidies the General Environmental Law (Ley 19300) and the General Law on Urbanism and Constructions (Decreto 458) as to consider either wetlands in general or urban wetlands in their provisions.

Scope of the law and definition of wetlands and urban wetlands
The scope of the law includes "marshes, swamps, peatlands or water-covered surfaces, be these either natural or artificial, permanent or temporal, stagnant or flowing, sweet, brackish or salt, including areas of sea water, whose depth a low tide does not exceed 6 m". The law consider urban wetlands those wetlands that are wholly or partially within an urban area.

See also
Chilean law on Sphagnum harverst
List of cities in Chile
List of towns in Chile

Notes

References

Environmental law in Chile
2020 in Chilean law
Wetland conservation
Urban wetlands of Chile